"Şən Azərbaycan" (Azerbaijani Cyrillic: "Шән Азәрбајҹан") is a Soviet-era patriotic song about Soviet Azerbaijan that still remains popular in modern Azerbaijan.

During the Soviet era, the song was often sung in both Azerbaijani and Russian. After the collapse of the USSR, the Russian lyrics fell out of popularity and are typically no longer sung.

Azerbaijani lyrics

Russian version  
Due to Russian being the de facto official language of the Soviet Union, a Russian-language version was produced alongside the Azerbaijani-language version. It is known in Russian as "Мой Азербайджан". This version was written by Onegin Gadgikasimov, a Soviet Azerbaijani poet of Russian background. However, it is rarely sung anymore in Azerbaijan following the collapse of the USSR.

References 

Azerbaijani songs